Mazzinghi is an Italian surname that may refer to
Alessandro Mazzinghi (born 1938), Italian boxer
Angelo Agostini Mazzinghi (1385–1438), Italian Roman Catholic priest 
Guido Mazzinghi (1932–1996), Italian Olympic boxer, brother of Alessandro
Joseph Mazzinghi (1765–1844), British composer

Italian-language surnames